Justice Gopal Rao Ekbote (1 June 1912 - 4 June 1994) was Chief Justice of Andhra Pradesh High Court.

Early life and education 
He was born on 1 June 1912. He was educated at the Osmania University.

Career 
In the 1952 elections, he was elected Member of the Legislative Assembly from Chaderghat.

He was appointed Additional Judge of the Andhra Pradesh High Court for a period of two years with effect from 7 June 1962 and Permanent Judge from 12 February 1964. He was appointed Chief Justice of A.P. with effect from 1 April 1972 and retired on 1 June 1974.

References

Judges of the Andhra Pradesh High Court
1912 births
1994 deaths
Chief Justices of the Andhra Pradesh High Court
20th-century Indian judges
Hyderabad State politicians
Members of the Andhra Pradesh Legislative Assembly